Norway Lake may refer to:

Norway Lake (Cass County, Minnesota), a lake in Minnesota
Norway Lake (Kandiyohi County, Minnesota), a lake in Minnesota
Norway Lake, Minnesota, an unincorporated community
Norway Lake (Rainy Creek drainage basin), Ontario, Canada
Norway Lake Township (disambiguation), multiple civil townships